Ferrières-Saint-Mary is a commune in the Cantal department in south-central France.

Buildings 

 Saint-Mary de Saint-Mary-le-Cros Church

Population

See also
Communes of the Cantal department

References

Communes of Cantal
Cantal communes articles needing translation from French Wikipedia